Chafalonías is a 1960 Argentine comedy film directed by Mario Soffici and starring Luis Sandrini.

Cast
Alberto Bello
Amalia Bernabé
Mary Capdevila
Eduardo de Labar
Maruja Lopetegui
Nora Massi
Inés Moreno
Malvina Pastorino
Antonio Provitilo
Eduardo Sandrini
Luis Sandrini
Osvaldo Terranova
Aída Villadeamigo

External links
 

1960 films
1960s Spanish-language films
Argentine black-and-white films
Films based on works by Guy de Maupassant
Films directed by Mario Soffici
1960 comedy films
Argentine comedy films
1960s Argentine films